Nimritz is a municipality in the district Saale-Orla-Kreis, in Thuringia, Germany.

References

Saale-Orla-Kreis